Hebei Win Power is a Chinese professional women's basketball club in the Women's Chinese Basketball Association (WCBA), based in Hengshui, Hebei.

Current players

References

External links

Women's Chinese Basketball Association teams
Hengshui